Beidazoon venustum is a deuterostome from the deuterostome group Vetulicolia. It originates from the lower Cambrian Chengjiang biota of Yunnan Province, China. Beidazoon was a marine organism discovered by Degan Shu in 2005.

The Beidazoon venustus had a hard outer shell similar to the Vetulicola. Beidazoon had a single band mouth. Its tail is asymmetrical and composed of a hard shell extending from the upper posterior, an axial lobe of seven segments, and a ventral lobe with four or five segments. Shu suggests that the Beidazoon's shell was "beautifully ornamented with numerous nodes".

References 

Vetulicolia